= Deyta =

Deyta LLC was a Louisville-based company founded in 1993 which conducted satisfaction surveys and quality measurement analyses in the health care industry, specializing in home health and hospice. It also provided systems to capture data and employee feedback.

It acquired Amplicare, which provided marketing software to homecare and hospices in 2012.

Its Deyta Analytics software is used by the salesforce in the home health and hospice sectors and by physicians to deal with queries about patients they have referred.

It was bought by HealthcareFirst, based in Springfield, Missouri, in April 2015. At that time it had more than 60 employees and more than 3000 customers across the USA.

It makes annual presentations of Hospice Honors, to hospices that provide the highest level of care satisfaction as assessed by caregivers. It uses an 18-point satisfaction survey measured against national averages. For Elite Status, a hospice must score better than the national average on all 18 of the evaluated questions. In 2017 it surveyed about 1,700 hospice services across the country and awarded 331 places with Hospice Honors.
